In ontology, ontic (from the Greek , genitive : "of that which is") is physical, real, or factual existence.

In more nuance, it means that which concerns particular, individuated beings rather than their modes of being; the present, actual thing in relation to the virtual, generalized dimension which makes that thing what it "is". An example includes the particular person and their actions, and the cultural background to which these actions bear relation and derive meaning from, the former being ontic (located in physicality), the latter ontological (located in virtuality).

Overview
Ontic describes what is there, as opposed to the nature or properties of that being.  To illustrate :

Roger Bacon, observing that all languages are built upon a common grammar, stated that they share a foundation of ontically anchored linguistic structures. 
Martin Heidegger posited the concept of Sorge, or caring, as the fundamental concept of the intentional being, and presupposed an ontological significance that distinguishes ontological being from mere "thinghood" of an ontic being. He uses the German word Dasein for a being that is capable of ontology, that is, recursively comprehending properties of the very fact of its own Being. For Heidegger, ontical signifies concrete, specific realities, whereas "ontological" signifies deeper underlying structures of reality. Ontological objects or subjects have an ontical dimension, but they also include aspects of being like self-awareness, evolutionary vestiges, future potentialities, and networks of relationship.
 Nicolai Hartmann distinguishes among ontology, ontics, and metaphysics: (i) ontology concerns the categorical analysis of entities by means of the knowledge categories able to classify them, (ii) ontics refers to a pre-categorical and pre-objectual connection which is best expressed in the relation to transcendent acts, and (iii) metaphysics is that part of ontics or that part of ontology which concerns the residue of being that cannot be rationalized further according to categories.

Philosophy of science 
In the philosophy of science, ontic is primarily used in debates over the nature of explanation and about structural realism. Wesley Salmon's ontic conception of explanation, for instance, claims that explanations are ontic only if they are mind-independent things in the world.

Harald Atmanspacher suggests that accurate claims about "ontic states describe all properties of a physical system exhaustively. ('Exhaustive' in this context means that an ontic state is 'precisely the way it is,' without any reference to epistemic knowledge or ignorance.)"

In an earlier paper, Atmanspacher portrays the difference between an epistemic perspective of a system, and an ontic perspective:

Philosophical discourse traditionally distinguishes between ontology and epistemology and generally enforces this distinction by keeping the two subject areas separated. However, the relationship between the two areas is of central importance to physics and philosophy of physics. For instance, many measurement-related problems force us to consider both our knowledge of the states and observables of a system (epistemic perspective) and its states and observables, independent of such knowledge (ontic perspective). This applies to quantum systems in particular.

Critical realism 

The British philosopher Roy Bhaskar, who is closely associated with the philosophical movement of critical realism writes:
"I differentiate the 'ontic' ('ontical' etc.) from the 'ontological'. I employ the former to refer to

 whatever pertains to being generally, rather than some distinctively philosophical (or scientific) theory of it (ontology), so that in this sense, that of the ontic1, we can speak of the ontic presuppositions of a work of art, a joke or a strike as much as a theory of knowledge; and, within this rubric, to
 the intransitive objects of some specific, historically determinate, scientific investigation (or set of such investigations), the ontic2.

"The ontic2 is always specified, and only identified, by its relation, as the intransitive object(s) of some or other (denumerable set of) particular transitive process(es) of enquiry. It is cognitive process-, and level-specific; whereas the ontological (like the ontic1) is not."

Writing in the Bhaskar mailing list archive, Ruth Groff offers this expansion of Bhaskar's note above:
"'ontic2' is an abstract way of denoting the object-domain of a particular scientific area, field, or inquiry. E.g.: molecules feature in the ontic2 of chemistry. He's just saying that the scientific undertaking ITSELF is not one of the objects of said, most narrowly construed, immediate object-domain. So chemistry itself is not part of the ontic2 of chemistry."

Some have argued that Bhaskar himself was too deeply entwined in the inherent vices and pitfalls of the English language to translate in simple terms the meaning of the terminology from a purely etymological sense. Derivative of ontic and logos.

See also

Ding an sich
Interpretations of quantum mechanics
Ontologism
Physical ontology
Substance theory

References

Sources
 Atmanspacher, Dr. H., and Primas, H., 2003 [2005], "Epistemic and Ontic Quantum Realities", in Khrennikov, A (Ed.), Foundations of Probability and Physics (American Institute of Physics 2005, pp 49–61, Originally published in Time, Quantum and Information, edited by Lutz Castell and Otfried Ischebeck, Springer, Berlin, 2003, pp 301–321
 Atmanspacher, Harald (2001) Determinism Is Ontic, Determinability is Epistemic (University of Pittsburgh Archives)
 Wright, Cory (2015) The ontic conception of scientific explanation. Stud in History and Philosophy of Science, 54: 20–30
  Bhaskar, R.A., 1986, Scientific Realism and Human Emancipation (London: Verso), pp 36 and 37, as quoted by Howard Engelskirchen in the \Bhaskar mailing list archive

Concepts in metaphysics
Martin Heidegger
Ontology
Reality